Baoji railway station is a railway station in Weibin District, Baoji, China. It is the junction of Baocheng Railway, Longhai Railway and Baozhong Railway. The station was constructed in 1936.

References 

Stations on the Longhai Railway
Stations on the Baoji–Chengdu Railway
Railway stations in Shaanxi
Railway stations in China opened in 1936